William Robert Steinecke (February 7, 1907 – July 20, 1986) was an American professional baseball catcher and manager. A native of Cincinnati who attended DePaul University, Steinecke spent almost 40 years in uniform, but only four games in Major League Baseball (with the  Pittsburgh Pirates).

After batting .361 for the Binghamton Triplets of the Class B New York–Pennsylvania League — and being elected the loop's all-star catcher for 1931 — Steinecke received his Pittsburgh trial. In four games and four at bats between September 16 and September 24, 1931, he went hitless. By the opening of the  season, he was back at Binghamton. Steinecke achieved his most sustained success in the New York–Penn League of the 1930s (now the Eastern League), batting over .300 in six different seasons. In his best campaign,  for the Williamsport Grays, Steinecke batted .349 with 110 runs batted in in 132 games played. All told, he appeared in 1,907 minor league games over 21 different seasons, batting .297 with 57 home runs and 855 RBI.

(As manager of the Class D McCook Braves of the Nebraska State League, he was a figure in former bonus-baby pitcher Pat Jordan's memoir, A False Spring.) He then served as a scout for the Braves and Montreal Expos. Steinecke died at age 79 in Saint Augustine, Florida.

References
 Johnson, Lloyd, ed., The Minor League Register. Durham, North Carolina: Baseball America, 1994.

External links
 Baseball Reference

1907 births
1986 deaths
Baseball players from Cincinnati
Beaumont Exporters players
Binghamton Triplets players
Davenport Blue Sox players
Dayton Ducks players
DePaul Blue Demons baseball players
DeLand Red Hats players
Fort Worth Cats players
Jacksonville Tars players
Kansas City Blues (baseball) players
Leesburg Packers players
Major League Baseball catchers
Minor league baseball managers
Montreal Expos scouts
Newark Bears (IL) players
Omaha Packers players
Pittsburgh Pirates players
Portsmouth Cubs players
Rock Island Islanders players
St. Augustine Saints players
Savannah Indians players
Scranton Miners players
Seattle Indians players
Suffolk Goobers players
Waterloo Hawks (baseball) players
Williamsport Grays players
Jesup Bees players